Mary Hagen (real name Marie Anna Wilhelmine Schön; 27 May 1876 – 12 November 1944) was a German operatic soprano and actress.

Life 
Born in Diez, Hagenwar was a student of Etelka Gerster, Conrad Muschler and Selma Nicklass-Kempner.

First performances were booked in 1896 at the Wilhelm Theatre in Magdeburg, engagements in Kiel, Aachen and Görlitz followed. Her change to the field of highly dramatic soprano for corresponding Wagner roles was not very successful.

Hagen is documented as an actress in the film Zigeunerblut by Urban Gad from 1911 in the role of Baroness Leonie Korff.

After the end of her singing career she settled down as a singing teacher. Since 1912 she was married to the music critic Leopold Schmidt, who worked in Berlin for the Berliner Tageblatt. She spent the last part of her life in the Emmy Göring convent in Weimar.

Roles 
 Féodora – Der Opernball (Richard Heuberger)
 Nelly – Der Obersteiger (Carl Zeller)
 Molly – The Geisha (Sidney Jones)
 Adele – Die Fledermaus (Johann Strauss II)
 Orlowsky – Die Fledermaus (Johann Strauss)
 Mirzl –  (Karl Millöcker)

Further reading 
 Hagen, Mary. In Karl-Josef Kutsch, Leo Riemens: Großes Sängerlexikon.  (vgl. Sängerlex. Vol. 2) K. G. Saur Verlag.
 Ludwig Eisenberg: Großes biographisches Lexikon der Deutschen Bühne im XIX. Jahrhundert. Paul List publishing house, Leipzig 1903,.

References

External links 
 

German operatic sopranos
Pseudonyms
German stage actresses
1876 births
1944 deaths
People from Rhein-Lahn-Kreis